SS Stephen Hopkins was a United States Merchant Marine Liberty ship that served in World War II.  She was the only US merchant vessel to sink a German surface combatant during the war.

She was built at the Permanente Metals Corporation (Kaiser) shipyards in Richmond, California.  Her namesake was Stephen Hopkins, a Founding Father and signer of the Declaration of Independence from Rhode Island. She was operated by Luckenbach Steamship Company under charter with the Maritime Commission and War Shipping Administration.

Action of 27 September 1942

She completed her first cargo run, but never made it home. On September 27, 1942, en route from Cape Town to Surinam, she encountered the heavily armed German commerce raider  and her tender .

Ordered to stop, Stephen Hopkins refused to surrender, and Stier opened fire.  Although greatly outgunned, the crew of Stephen Hopkins fought back, replacing the Armed Guard crew of the ship's lone 4-inch (102 mm) gun with volunteers as they fell. The fight was fierce and short, and by its end both ships were wrecks.

Stephen Hopkins sank at 10:00. Stier, too heavily damaged to continue its voyage, was scuttled by its crew less than two hours later.  Most of the crew of Stephen Hopkins died, including Captain Paul Buck.  The survivors drifted on a lifeboat for a month before reaching shore in Brazil.

Captain Buck was posthumously awarded the Merchant Marine Distinguished Service Medal for his actions.  So was US Merchant Marine Academy cadet Edwin Joseph O'Hara, who single-handedly fired the last shots from the ship's 4-inch gun. Navy reservist Lt. (j.g.) Kenneth Martin Willett, commander of the Armed Guard detachment which manned the ship's 4-inch gun, was posthumously awarded the Navy Cross.

Recognition
O'Hara Hall, the gymnasium facility at the United States Merchant Marine Academy, is named in honor of Midshipman O'Hara. 
Captain Paul Buck, master of SS Stephen Hopkins, was given the Merchant Marine Distinguished Service Medal by The President of the United States.  For determination to fight his ship and his perseverance in engaging the enemy to the utmost until his ship was rendered helpless. The award was given by Admiral Emory S. Land.
George S. Cronk, Second Engineer on the ship, sailed his lifeboat 2,200 miles for 31 days to save his shipmates. He was given the Merchant Marine Distinguished Service Medal by the President of the United States. The award was given by Admiral Emory S. Land.
SS Stephen Hopkins was awarded the Gallant Ship Award for outstanding courage against overpowering odds by the U.S. Department of Transportation, Maritime Administration.

See also
Action of 6 June 1942

References

External links
The Gallant Liberty Ship SS Stephen Hopkins Sinks a German Raider  from American Merchant Marine at War – U.S. Maritime Service Veterans
Gallant Ship Award Citation from U.S. Department of Transportation, Maritime Administration.
 Ships of the World: An Historical Encyclopedia from Houghton Mifflin.
Tribute to Paul Buck  and an account of the battle.
Website  for Liberty Ship SS Jeremiah O'Brien
Website for Liberty Ship SS John W. Brown

Liberty ships
Shipwrecks in the Atlantic Ocean
Ships built in Richmond, California
1942 ships
Maritime incidents in September 1942
Auxiliary cruisers
Ships named for Founding Fathers of the United States